Wikstroemia hanalei, the lavafield false ohelo, is a shrub, of the family Thymelaeaceae.  It is native to the Hawaiian Islands, specifically Kauai.

Description
The shrub has an erect habit, and grows small red fruits up to 13 mm long and 6 mm in diameter. It is believed to be extinct as of 1990.

References

fruticosa